Zdravko Iliev (born 19 October 1984) is a Bulgarian football player who plays as a right back for Etar Veliko Tarnovo.

Career
On 22 December 2013, Iliev signed a one-and-a-half-year contract with CSKA Sofia. On July 13, 2014 he became a free agent and soon after that rejoined Loko Plovdiv.

In June 2018, Iliev signed with Pirin Blagoevgrad.

Honours

Club
Beroe
Bulgarian Cup (2): 2009–10, 2012–13
Bulgarian Supercup (1): 2013

References

External links
 
 

1984 births
Living people
Sportspeople from Stara Zagora
Bulgarian footballers
Association football fullbacks
First Professional Football League (Bulgaria) players
Second Professional Football League (Bulgaria) players
PFC Beroe Stara Zagora players
PFC CSKA Sofia players
PFC Lokomotiv Plovdiv players
FC Vereya players
SFC Etar Veliko Tarnovo players